General Olds may refer to:

Robert Olds (1896–1943), U.S. Army Air Forces major general
Robin Olds (1922–2007), U.S. Air Force brigadier general

See also
Attorney General Olds (disambiguation)